Anfesta stankovskii is a tri-radially symmetrical fossil animal that lived in the late Ediacaran (Vendian) seafloor.  It is a member of the extinct group Trilobozoa.

Etymology
The generic and specific names of the Anfesta stankovskii honour the Arkhangel'sk geologist Anatoliy F. Stankovskii.

Occurrence
Fossils of Anfesta stankovskii are known from deposits of the Verkhovka and Yorga formations on the Karakhta River in Onega Peninsula and Zimnii Bereg (Winter Coast) of the White Sea, Arkhangelsk Region, Russia.

Description
Anfesta represents a flattened, hemispherical form with three-fold symmetry. At the centre of the organism, 3 elongate and sausage-like  ridges radiate from the centre and are put away from each other by 120 degrees and make the animal always divisible into 3 parts and the ridges becoming rounded at both edges. The same ridges bifurcate twice near both of their ends. In some specimens of A. stankovskii, a large amount of furrows (originally interpreted as tentacles) appear and make Anfesta look similar in anatomy to Albumares and Skinnera (Mostly Albumares).

Reconstruction and affinity
Anfesta was originally described by Mikhail Fedonkin as a free-swimming scyphozoa-like medusa. The branched furrows on the fossil were interpreted as imprints of a system of internal radial canals, and the three oval ridges as imprints of gonads.

A year later, Fedonkin transferred such fossil animals as Anfesta, Albumares and Tribrachidium to the separate group Trilobozoa, populated by three-lobed, radially symmetric, coelenterate-grade animals that only superficially resemble cnidarians. Originally, Trilobozoa was established as a class within the phylum Coelenterata, but since Coelenterata was divided into separate phyla - Cnidaria and Ctenophora - the Trilobozoa have been transferred to rank of phylum.

According to the latest research, Anfesta was a soft-bodied benthic organism that temporarily attached (but did not adhere) to the substrate of its habitat (microbial mats). This fossil is an imprint of the upper side of the animal body, with some elements of its external and internal anatomy visible to the naked eye. The branched furrows on the fossil are imprints of radial grooves on the animal's surface, while the three central ridges are imprints of cavities within the body. Presumably, this system of grooves and cavities could be related to the collection and digestion of food particles.

See also
 List of Ediacaran genera

References

Ediacaran life
Trilobozoa
White Sea fossils
Fossil taxa described in 1984
Ediacaran
Aquatic animals